Caminhos do Coração is a Brazilian telenovela aired on Rede Record. Created by Tiago Santiago and directed by Alexandre Avancini, it was replaced by a spin-off called Os Mutantes: Caminhos do Coração, airing since June 3, 2008.

Plot
The plot develops around Maria Luz who is accused of killing Dr. Socrates Mayer, owner of one of the largest private clinics in the country, Progênese. Dr. Júlia, an affiliated physician of Progênese created genetically modified human beings, mutants with superpowers. Júlia has always maintained a secret laboratory on the fictional island of Arraial, where she performs the experiments that originated the mutants. She is helped by Gór, who has the power of hypnosis, and the superintelligent child Eugênio.

Maria Luz has lived in the circus of Don Peppe with her parents Ana Luz and Pepe all of her life. She is the main attraction of the circus where she was raised and met first love interest Fernando. Maria is also the best friend of Juanita, her sister-in-law. Maria falls out of love with Fernando when he gets involved with Esmeralda. After Maria discovers that she is an adopted child, she finds herself in a tight spot: the police find her lying near Socrates' dead body and accuse her of killing him. Maria then discovers that her real father is the person she is accused of killing. This was set up so that Maria could not inherit Socrates's large wealth.

The Mayer family belongs to São Paulo's traditional elite. It is composed of the brothers Sócrates, Aristóteles and Platão Mayer. Ari is widowed and has three mutant children: Toni, who can deviate from bullets and has over human strength, Rodrigo, who has hypnotic powers, and Danilo, who has super agility and marries Lucinha to hide his homosexuality from his father. Platão is married to Irma and has two daughters: Regina and Cléo, who are discovered to have the powers of survival and astral projection. The Mayer family is one of the shareholders of Progênese, together with Mauro Fontes and Josias Martinelli. Josias is married to Cassandra and is the father of Lucas, who reads thoughts, and Janete, who has the power of clairvoyance.

After her arrest, Maria is helped by federal police officer Marcelo Montenegro, with whom she falls in love. Marcelo had recently been widowed by the death of Mabel who was poisoned. The poisoned sweet that killed his wife was intended to be eaten by his mutant daughter Tatiana. By helping Maria to escape from the prison, Marcelo becomes a fugitive from the law and the couple go through several adventures to escape the unscrupulous commissioner Taveira, who feels an unanswered desire for Maria.

Platão and Josias are murdered when they discover who is responsible for Socrates', Dr. Walker's (an American researcher who discovered the truth about the mutants) and Mabel's deaths. Maria and Marcelo are seeking to discover who hired serial killer Eric Fulisy to commit all the crimes.

It is revealed in the last chapter that Júlia hired Fulisy. She also hired attorney César Rubicão to kidnap Maria, when she was still a baby, and leave her anywhere. He chooses to leave her at the circus. Thirty years later, Socrates reveals that he would leave his entire wealth to a foundation, shocking his family. Afraid that it would harm her experiments, Júlia hired Eric to kill him and put Maria on the crime scene because she knew that Socrates would leave Maria his fortune if they ever met each other again. She suspected that if Maria received his wealth, she would close Progênese and harm her experiences. Júlia then decided to eliminate all those who discovered or suspected that she was responsible for Socrates' death. She also hired Eric to kill Rosana and nurse Ruth among other failed killing attempts. Helga, former wife of Eric, who became a better person after leaving him, also suffered attacks, as did Tatiana, Marcelo and Maria.

The season ended with Rubicão revealing in court, via hologram, who was responsible for the crimes. In the following season, Os Mutantes: Caminhos do Coração, Júlia drank some of the youth serum that she produced and adopted the pseudonym of Juli Di Trevi.

Cast

Main cast

 Bianca Rinaldi - Maria Beatriz dos Santos Luz (Maria Mayer)
 Leonardo Vieira - Marcelo Duarte Montenegro (Gabriel Lage)
 Ítala Nandi - Dra. Júlia Zaccarias
 Gabriel Braga Nunes - Taveira (Sigismundo Taveira)
 Tuca Andrada - Eric Fusilly (Werewolf)
 Cássio Scapin - César Rubicão
 Julianne Trevisol - Górgona (Gór)
 Felipe Folgosi - Roberto Duarte Montenegro (Beto)
 André de Biase - Aristóteles Mayer (Ari)
 Patrycia Travassos - Irma Mayer
 Angelina Muniz - Cassandra Fontes Martinelli
 Giselle Policarpo - Cléo Mayer
 Liliana Castro - Janete Fontes Martinelli
 Jean Fercondini - Lucas Fontes Martinelli
 Paulo Nigro - Antônio Mayer (Toni)
 Ângelo Paes Leme - Rodrigo Mayer
 Cláudio Heinrich - Danilo Mayer
 Fernanda Nobre - Lúcia Rocha Mayer
 Natasha Haydt - Paola Riccete
 Jéssica Golcci - Alice Bandisnki
 Thaís Fersoza - Célia (Celinha)
 Mônica Carvalho - Amália Fortunato
 Daniel Aguiar - Vladmir (Vlado)
 Karen Junqueira - Fury
 Sacha Bali - Matheus Morpheus (Metamorfo)
 Preta Gil - Helga Silva da Silveira
 Lana Rodes - Esmeralda Nascimento Justo
 André Segatti - Ernesto Justo
 Rafaela Mandelli - Regina Mayer
 Taumaturgo Ferreira - Batista (Tarcísio Batista)
 Eduardo Lago - Luís Guilherme Batista Figueiredo (Guiga)
 Andréa Avancini - Érica Figueira
 Pedro Malta - Eugênio Menezes Figueiredo
 Maurício Ribeiro - Cristiano Pena (Cris)
 Ana Paula Moraes - Marli da Silva
 Fafá de Belém - Ana Gabriela dos Santos Luz
 Perfeito Fortuna - Pepe Luz
 Fernando Pavão - Noel Machado (Noé)
 Guilherme Trajano - Dino Malafatti
 Anna Markun – Juanita Biavatti (Snake Woman)
 Théo Becker - Fernando Biavatti (Big Snake)
 Natália Guimarães - Ariadne
 Allan Souza Lima - Meduso
 Maria Carolina Ribeiro - Silvana Madiano
 Louise D'Tuani - Ísis
 Andressa Oliveira - Raquel Lins
 Helder Agostini - Demétrio
 Bruno Miguel – Lúpi / Lobo
 Patrícia de Jesus - Perpétua Salvador
 Suyane Moreira - Iara
 André Mattos -  Pachola (Paulo Pachola)
 Helena Xavier - Simone dos Santos
 Sebastião Vasconcellos - Mauro Fonte
 José Dumont - Teófilo Magalhães
 Juliana Xavier - Ágatha Magalhães
 Sérgio Malheiros - Aquiles Magalhães
 Rômulo Estrela - Draco
 Rômulo Arantes Neto - Telê
 Diego Christo - Hélio Bezerra
 Rocco Pitanga - Carvalho (Armando Carvalho)
 Marina Miranda - Marisa Gama
 Marcos Suhre - Ice Man
 Juliana Martins - Marlene França
 João Paulo Silvino - Lion
 Joaquim de Castro - Adolfo
 Ricardo Macchi - Goliath
 Daniel Marinho - Capeletti
 Fábio Nascimento – Minotauro
 Carolina Chalita - Marialva
 Márcio Libar - Vagabond

Children and teenagers
 Letícia Medina - Tatiana Montenegro (Tati)
 Sérgio Malheiros - Aquiles Magalhães
 Juliana Xavier - Ágata Magalhães
 Pedro Malta - Eugênio Figueira (Small Genius)
 Shaila Arsene - Clara Figueira (Clarinha / Lighting)
 Júlia Maggessi - Ângela Figueira (Small Angel)
 Cássio Ramos - Valfredo Pachola (Vavá / Wolfboy)

Guest stars

 Eduardo Munniz - Policial
 Walmor Chagas - Dr. Sócrates Mayer
 Lance Henriksen - Dr. Christopher Walker
 Ricardo Petraglia - Platão Mayer
 Paulo Gorgulho - Josias Martinelli
 Alexandre Barillari - Ramon Fusilly
 Nanda Ziegler - Bianca Fischer
 Amandha Lee - Felina
 Ana Rosa - Dalva Duarte Montenegro
 Regina Maria Dourado - Altina Pachola
 Ronnie Marruda - Pedreira (Micael Pedreira)
 Lígia Fagundes - Leonor Batista
 Maria Ceiça - Rosana Magalhães
 Adriana Quadros - Teresa Rocha
 Tammy Luciano - Ivoredo Cavalcanti
 Babi Xavier - Júli D'Trevi
 Myriam Pérsia - Mariana Mayer
 Toni Garrido - Gustavo Gama (Gúdi)
 Gabriela Moreyra - Graziela Machado (Grazi)
 Déo Garcez - Benedito Gama (Bené)
 Karina Bacchi - Glória
 Maria Cláudia - Ruth
 Raquel Nunes - Keila Nunes
 Sabrina Greve - Mabel Montenegro
 Mário Cardoso - Bento nete
 Bianca Joy Porte - Valéria
 Augusto Vargas - Cassiano Dias
 Raymundo de Souza - Figueroa (Juan Figueroa / Pablo Figueroa)
 Carlos Thiré - Jean Pierre
 Françoise Forton - Juíza
 Daniel Andrade - Zé Doido
 Java Mayam - Joca
 Paloma Bernardi - Luna
 José Loreto - Scorpio
 Jorge Pontual - Felipe Matoso
 Ana Carbatti - Dr. Beatriz
 Cíntia Moneratt - Edite
 Maria Sílvia - Magda
 Úrsula Corona - Alícia
 Gabriel Macri - Pedro
 Luiz Nicolau - Pé-de-Cabra
 Luciano Leme - Marino
 Amélia Soares - Maria Butina
 Rô Sant'Anna - Machadona (Ruthinéia)
 Maria Cristina Gatti - Corôa
 Kako Nolasko - Falcone
 Anderson Bruno - Zé Sinistro
 Thiago Luciano - civil policeman
 Márcio Rosário - taxi driver in Miami

Audience
On February 6, 2008, Caminhos do Coração became the first Rede Record telenovela to achieve the first place on the São Paulo TV rank. On that day, it was watched by around 1,2 million households (approximately 5 million people) in the city. A soccer match between Corinthians and Barueri aired by Rede Globo during the same timeslot was watched by 1,1 million households (around 4,4 million people). In its peak, the telenovela was watched by 1,5 million households (near 6 million people).

The last chapter of Caminhos do Coração achieved an audience of more than 5 million people in São Paulo. It was the highest audience for a Record telenovela since the last chapter of controversial Vidas Opostas. This high rate made A Favorita achieve the worst telenovela debut in Globo's history.

Mutations

Soundtrack
 "Sabe Você" - Toni Garrido (opening theme)
 "Maria, Maria" - Roupa Nova (theme of Maria)
 "Grande Amor" - Fafá de Belém (theme of Maria and Marcelo)
 "Raça" - Fafá de Belém and Milton Nascimento (theme of Esmeralda and Ernesto)
 "Caçador de mim" - 14 Bis (general theme)
 "Mutante" - Preta Gil (theme of Helga)
 "A vida é minha" - Capital Inicial (theme of Irma and Aristoteles)
 "Zigue Zague" - Jair Rodrigues featuring Jair Oliveira and Simoninha (theme of Batista)
 "Procurando a Estrela" - Zé Ramalho and Daniela Mercury (theme of Teófilo and the Well-Doing League)
 "The Game of the Life" - Scorpions (theme of Eric and the Evil-Doing League)
 "Baby" - Tim Maia (theme of Lúcia and Danilo)
 "Sonho de Ícaro" - Byafra (theme of the children)
 "Robocop Gay" - Mamonas Assassinas (theme of Danilo)
 "Sexo" - Oswaldo Montenegro (general theme)
 "Cais" - Milton Nascimento (theme of Teófilo)
 "Samba de uma Noite Só" - Fernando Cavallieri (theme of Rodrigo, Amália and Célia)

References

External links
 Official website
 Interview with creator Tiago Santiago
 

2007 telenovelas
2007 Brazilian television series debuts
2008 Brazilian television series endings
RecordTV telenovelas
Brazilian science fiction television series
Brazilian telenovelas
Television shows set in São Paulo
Medical telenovelas
Portuguese-language telenovelas
Minotaur
Television series about shapeshifting
Television series about mutants